McGurk is a surname of Irish origin. Notable people with this surname include:

People 
Adam McGurk (born 1989), Northern Irish footballer
Anna McGurk (died 1991), English council worker who was raped and murdered
Anthony McGurk, retired Gaelic footballer
Brett McGurk, Director for Iraq, United States National Security Council
Brian McGurk (died after 1712), Irish priest during the Penal Times
Chris McGurk (born 1957), American producer
David McGurk (born 1982), English footballer
Francis McGurk (1909–1978), Scotland international footballer
Frank McGurk (disambiguation), several people
Harry McGurk (1936–1998), Scottish cognitive psychologist known for the discovery of the McGurk effect
Hugh Martin McGurk, former Gaelic footballer; brother of Anthony McGurk
Johnny McGurk (born 1965), retired Gaelic footballer; brother of Anthony and Hugh
Michael McGurk (died 1948), Northern Ireland politician
Michael Loch McGurk (1958–2009), Australian businessman and murder victim
Tom McGurk (born 1946), Irish poet

Fictional characters 
Jack McGurk, nine-year-old hero of a series of books by Edmund Wallace Hildick
Slag McGurk, hero of the 1947 film The Mighty McGurk, played by Wallace Beery
McGurk, a villain in the Bob Hope/Bing Crosby film Road to Utopia
McGurk, a dog (played by an actor) in the television series pilot McGurk: A Dog's Life

See also
Carrickmore in the Parish of Termonmaguirc (McGurk), County Tyrone, Northern Ireland
McGurk Meadow in Yosemite National Park, California
McGurk Cabin, in Yosemite National Park, the seasonal home of cattleman Jack McGurk from 1895 to 1897
McGurk Effect, where a sound is misheard because of a misleading visual cue